Matthew Dunn (born January 13, 1994) is an American professional soccer player.

Career
After spending time with the youth clubs of Grasshopper Club Zürich and FC Dallas, Dunn signed with German club 1. FC Köln, where he spent two years. After his release from Köln, Dunn signed with Serbian side OFK Beograd where he spent 18-months, but didn't make a first-team appearance.

After returning to the United States, Dunn enrolled at the University of Maine at Fort Kent in 2013, where he scored 7 goals in 17 appearances. Dunn left UMFK to enter the MLS Waiver Draft and was selected by Chivas USA on April 17, 2014.

In November 2014, following the contraction of the Chivas USA franchise, Dunn was selected by New York City FC in the 2014 MLS Dispersal Draft.

Dunn was waived by New York City on June 24, 2015.

Matt Dunn was part of the United States squad at the 2011 FIFA U-17 World Cup.

References

External links 
 
 

1994 births
Living people
American soccer players
American expatriate soccer players
OFK Beograd players
Chivas USA players
New York City FC players
Wilmington Hammerheads FC players
Association football midfielders
Soccer players from Dallas
Expatriate footballers in Serbia
Major League Soccer players
USL Championship players
United States men's youth international soccer players